Orrsburg is an unincorporated community in Nodaway County, in the U.S. state of Missouri.

History
Orrsburg was laid out in 1881, and named after an early settler.  A post office called Orrsburg was established in 1881, and remained in operation until 1902.

References

Unincorporated communities in Nodaway County, Missouri
Unincorporated communities in Missouri